Oğuzeli is a town of Gaziantep Province of Turkey with a population of 16,534 as of 2010. It is the administrative seat of Oğuzeli district. The town is inhabited by Turkmens of the Barak tribe and Abdals of the Maya Sekenler tribe.

References

Oğuzeli District
Populated places in Gaziantep Province